Seitan is a food made from gluten, the main protein of wheat.
It is also known as miànjīn, fu, milgogi, wheat meat, gluten meat, vital wheat gluten or simply gluten. It is made by washing wheat flour dough with water until all the starch granules have been removed, leaving behind the sticky, insoluble gluten as an elastic mass, which is then cooked before being eaten.

Wheat gluten is an alternative to soybean-based foods such as tofu, which are sometimes used as a meat alternative. Some types of wheat gluten have a chewy or stringy texture that resembles meat more than other substitutes. Wheat gluten is often used instead of meat in Asian, vegetarian, vegan, Buddhist, and macrobiotic cuisines. Mock duck is a common use for wheat.

Wheat gluten first appeared during the 6th century as an ingredient for Chinese noodles. It has historically been popular in the cuisines of China, Japan and other East and Southeast Asian nations. In Asia, it is commonly found on the menus of restaurants catering primarily to Buddhist customers who do not eat meat.

History
Wheat gluten has been documented in China since the 6th century. It was widely consumed by the Chinese as a substitute for meat, especially among adherents of Buddhism. The oldest reference to wheat gluten appears in the Qimin Yaoshu, a Chinese agricultural encyclopedia written by Jia Sixie in 535. The encyclopedia mentions noodles prepared from wheat gluten called bótuō. Wheat gluten was known as miànjīn by the Song dynasty (960–1279). Wheat gluten arrived in the West by the 18th century. De Frumento, an Italian treatise on wheat written in Latin by Bartolomeo Beccari in 1728 and published in Bologna in 1745, describes the process of washing wheat flour dough to extract the gluten. John Imison wrote an English-language definition of wheat gluten in his Elements of Science and Art published in 1803. By the 1830s, Western doctors were recommending wheat gluten in diets for diabetics. In the United States, the Seventh-day Adventists promoted the consumption of wheat gluten beginning in the late 19th century. Sanitarium Foods, a company affiliated with John Harvey Kellogg's Battle Creek Sanitarium, advertised wheat gluten in 1882.

Etymology of seitan
The word seitan is of Japanese origin and was coined in 1961 by George Ohsawa, a Japanese advocate of the macrobiotic diet, to refer to a wheat gluten product created by Ohsawa's student Kiyoshi Mokutani. In 1962, wheat gluten was sold as seitan in Japan by Marushima Shoyu K.K. It was imported to the West in 1969 by the American company Erewhon. The etymology of seitan is uncertain, but it is believed to come from combining the characters 生 (sei, "fresh, raw") and 蛋 (tan, from 蛋白 (tanpaku, "protein")).

Forms

Chinese

Wheat gluten, called miànjīn in Chinese (traditional: , simplified: , literally "dough tendon"; also spelled mien chin or mien ching) is believed to have originated in ancient China, as a meat substitute for adherents of Buddhism, particularly some Mahayana Buddhist monks, who are strict vegetarians (see Buddhist cuisine). One story attributes the invention of imitation meat to chefs who made it for Chinese emperors who, traditionally, observed a week of vegetarianism each year. Miàn jīn is often deep fried before being cooked in Chinese cuisine, which confers a crispy rind that enhances the texture of the gluten.  There are three primary Chinese forms of wheat gluten.

They are golden brown in color, and braised or boiled in a savory soup or stew before eating. They are frequently paired with xiang gu (black mushrooms). These are often stuffed with meat or tofu mixtures and served as a dish called "gluten meatballs" (Miàn jīn roù wán) or "gluten stuffed with meat" (miàn jīn saī roù).

Steamed gluten (zhēng miànjīn), is raw gluten that has been wrapped around itself to form a long sausage shape which is then steamed. This type of gluten has a dense texture and ranges from off-white to light greenish grey in color. It is torn open into strips before being used as an ingredient in recipes. When this sausage-shaped gluten is thickly sliced into medallions, the resulting form is called miàn lún (麵輪, literally "gluten wheels"). Larger blocks of steamed gluten are sometimes colored pink and sold as vegetarian "mock ham." Steamed gluten is also a well-known food in Xi'an. Steamed gluten can be served with bean sprout and cucumbers as a cold dish, or served with liáng pí (凉皮).

Baked spongy gluten (traditional ; simplified ; pinyin: kǎo fū) is similar in texture to a sponge, kao fu (sometimes labeled in English as "bran puff") is made by leavening raw gluten, and then baking or steaming it. These are sold as small blocks in Chinese markets and are then diced up and cooked. This type of gluten absorbs its cooking liquid like a sponge and is enjoyed for its "juicy" character. Chinese kao fu has a different texture from its Japanese counterpart, yaki-fu, due to the relatively larger air bubbles it contains.  Kao fu is available in fresh, frozen, dehydrated, and canned forms.

Miànjīn is also available in Asian grocery stores in canned and jarred forms, often marinated in combination with peanuts or mushrooms. Such canned and jarred gluten is commonly eaten as an accompaniment to congee (boiled rice porridge) as part of a traditional Chinese breakfast. Depending on its method of preparation and ingredients used, both fresh and preserved miànjīn can be used to simulate pork, poultry, beef, or even seafood.

Japanese

In Japan, the two main types of fu are most widely used in Buddhist vegetarian cooking (Shojin ryōri) and tea ceremony cuisine (cha-kaiseki). There are two main forms of fu, the raw nama-fu, and dry-baked yaki-fu.

Raw (nama-fu ) is solid gluten which is mixed with glutinous rice flour and millet and steamed in large blocks. It may be shaped and colored in a variety of ways, using ingredients such as mugwort. Popular shapes include autumn-colored maple leaves and bunnies. Such shapes and colors enhance the attractiveness of the cooked product since steamed gluten has an unappealing grey hue.  Nama-fu is an important ingredient in Shōjin-ryōri, the Buddhist vegetarian cuisine of Japan.  It may also be used as an ingredient in wagashi, Japanese confectionery.  Fu-manjū is a type of manjū made from nama-fu. Solid gluten is sweetened and filled with various sweet fillings such as red bean paste. They are then wrapped in leaves and steamed in a manner similar to that used to prepare Chinese zongzi.

Dry baked (yaki-fu  or sukiyaki-fu ) is gluten leavened with baking powder and baked into long bread-like sticks.  It is often sold in cut form, as hard dry discs resembling croutons or bread rusk. Yaki-fu is typically added to miso soup and sukiyaki, where it absorbs some of the broth and acquires a fine texture that is lighter and fluffier than its Chinese equivalent.  It is the most commonly available type of fu in Japanese supermarkets.

In Japan, seitan, initially a rather salty macrobiotic seasoning that gradually evolved into a food, is not well known or widely available, despite the macrobiotic diet's Japanese origins. Outside macrobiotic circles, these terms are virtually unknown in Japan, and they do not typically appear in Japanese dictionaries.

Along with tofu and Abura-age, Fu can be used as a substitute for meat in Japanese cuisine.

Vietnamese
Along with tofu, it is a part of the Buddhist cuisine of Vietnam.

Macrobiotic
The meaning of the word "seitan" has undergone a gradual evolution. The initial product, imported from Japan in 1969 was a very salty seasoning, the color of soy sauce, sold in a small glass jar or plastic pouch, to be used as a seasoning for brown rice. The name gradually came to refer to any wheat gluten seasoned with soy sauce. The people most responsible for this change were Nik and Joanne Amartseff, who invented Tan Pups in 1972 and John Weissman, who in 1974 invented Wheatmeat (first meatballs then cutlets made of seitan) in Boston. All worked for years to popularize these pioneering products at the Erewhon retail store, and developed a trademark on the Wheatmeat name.

While wheat gluten itself is rather flavorless, it holds a marinade very well and is usually simmered in a dashi (broth) made from soy sauce, kombu, ginger, and sometimes also sesame oil.

Western

Since the mid-20th century, wheat gluten (usually called seitan) has been increasingly adopted by vegetarians in Western nations as a meat alternative. It is sold in block, strip and shaped forms in North America, where it can be found in some supermarkets, Asian food markets, health food stores and cooperatives.

The block form of seitan is often flavored with shiitake or portobello mushrooms, fresh coriander or onion, or barbecue sauce, or packed in a vegetable-based broth. In strip form, it can be packed to be eaten right out of the package as a high-protein snack. Shaped seitan products, in the form of "ribs" and patties, are frequently flavored with barbecue, teriyaki, or other savory sauces.

Wheat gluten is also used in many vegetarian products in various countries, for example by The African Hebrew Israelites of Jerusalem, a vegan African-American religious sect that operates a chain of restaurants, to produce vegetarian sandwiches. In North America, there are several brand-name meat alternatives, which are used in the restaurant and food service markets.

Vital wheat gluten
A powdered form of wheat gluten is produced and sold as an additive for baking or used to make seitan. When used to make seitan wheat gluten is often flavoured with liquid smoke, smoked paprika and garlic powder. Vital wheat gluten is nearly all gluten and almost no starch. When used as an additive in baking, its purpose is to add elasticity to flours that would otherwise be low in gluten, such as whole wheat flour or rye. It improves the rise of the raw dough and also improves the texture and chewiness of the final product. Very little is required, generally about 1 Tablespoon (15ml) per 2–3 cups (480–720 ml) of flour.

Production
The powdered form of wheat gluten (vital wheat gluten), is made by hydrating hard wheat flour to activate the gluten and then processing the hydrated mass to remove the starch, leaving only the gluten. The gluten is then dried and ground back into a powder.

Seitan may be made from vital wheat gluten or from hard wheat flour (a.k.a. high-protein flour, high-gluten flour, or gluten flour). When seitan is made from vital wheat gluten, the powder is simply rehydrated to form the gluten and then cooked. Seitan produced from wheat flour is a longer process. First a dough is made by hydrating the flour, then the dough is kneaded under running water to remove the starch from the dough, leaving only the gluten. The gluten is then cut into pieces and cooked via steaming, boiling, frying, or other methods.

Animal feed
Wheat gluten is used both as a protein source and binding ingredient in pet foods. Wheat gluten from China adulterated by melamine was blamed as the cause of the 2007 pet food recalls.

See also 

 List of meat substitutes
 Textured vegetable protein
 Vegan cuisine

References

External links

 "Un-American Pet Food: Why do we put Chinese wheat gluten in Fido's kibble?", Michelle Tsai, Slate.com, April 2, 2007

Buddhist cuisine
Chinese cuisine
Chinese inventions
Gluten
Japanese cuisine
Meat substitutes
Vegan cuisine
Vegetarian cuisine
Vegetarian dishes of China
Vietnamese cuisine
Wheat